is a Japanese politician and was the leader of the Democratic Party from 1 September 2017 until its dissolution later that month. He has also been a member of the House of Representatives of Japan since 1993.

Maehara was the leader of the Democratic Party of Japan (DPJ) from 2005 to 2006, and later served as Minister of Land, Infrastructure, Transport and Tourism and Minister of Foreign Affairs under the cabinets of Yukio Hatoyama and Naoto Kan, before resigning from the cabinet in March 2011 after he acknowledged receiving illegal donations from a South Korean national living in Japan. Maehara is viewed as a "China hawk" and a proponent of close ties with the United States. He is also often viewed as being politically conservative.

Personal background
Maehara was born in Kyoto to parents from Tottori Prefecture. He attended the law faculty of Kyoto University, where he majored in international politics. He attended the Matsushita Institute of Government and Management from 1987 to 1991.

Maehara married his wife Airi (愛里) in June 1995; they have no children. He likes to take photographs of trains as a hobby.

Early political career
Maehara won election to the Kyoto Prefectural Assembly in 1991 with the support of, among others, future Diet member Keiro Kitagami. At the time, he was the youngest prefectural assemblyman in Kyoto history.

He was elected to the House of Representatives as a member of the Japan New Party of Morihiro Hosokawa in 1993. In 1994, he left the party and formed the "Democratic Wave" with several other young parliamentarians, but later that year joined the Sakigake Party, which was briefly part of the majority government. In 1998, he joined the Democratic Party of Japan (DPJ) when it was formed that same year.

As a member of the DPJ he focused on security affairs and often negotiated with the government.  In the shadow governments he has served as the Shadow Minister for Security Affairs and Shadow Minister for the Defense Agency.

Term as DPJ President
After the crushing defeat of the DPJ in the 2005 snap election and the resignation of DPJ leader Katsuya Okada, the elected representatives of the party met to choose a new leader. The two candidates were Naoto Kan and Maehara. Maehara defeated the 58-year-old Kan by a razor-thin count of 96–94 in open balloting by party members from both Houses of the Diet, with two members abstaining and two others having cast invalid votes. Maehara was appointed DPJ president on 17 September 2005.

However, Maehara's term as party leader was short lived. Although he initially led the party's criticism of the Koizumi administration, particularly in regards to connections between LDP lawmakers and scandal-ridden Livedoor, the revelation that a fake email was used to try to establish this link greatly damaged his credibility. The scandal led to the resignation of Representative Hisayasu Nagata and of Maehara as party leader on 31 March. New elections for party leader were held on 7 April, in which Ichirō Ozawa was elected president.

Cabinet
In the 2009 Japanese general election, the Democratic Party won a two-thirds majority of the House of Representatives, allowing the party to form a new government.

Minister of Land, Infrastructure and Transport
Maehara was appointed Minister of Land, Infrastructure and Transport on 16 September 2009. In this role, he was the spokesman for a number of government initiatives, including:

 Cessation of construction work on Yamba Dam
 Opening Haneda Airport in Tokyo to long-haul international flights
 Bankruptcy restructuring of Japan Airlines
 Experimentation with reducing or eliminating tolls on the Japanese expressway network

Minister of Foreign Affairs
Then Prime Minister Naoto Kan reshuffled the cabinet effective 17 September 2010, making Maehara the youngest Minister of Foreign Affairs in postwar Japanese history. The main international relations event during his tenure as foreign minister was the 2010 Senkaku boat collision incident, which led to increased tensions between Japan and the People's Republic of China concerning their overlapping claims to the Senkaku Islands.

Resignation from the Cabinet
In March 2011, only four days before the 11 March earthquake and tsunami, Maehara resigned as Minister for Foreign Affairs after it emerged that he had accepted a political donation of ¥250,000 (approx. US$3,000) from a 72-year-old South Korean permanent resident of Japan who operated a restaurant in Kyoto. Maehara had known the woman since junior high school, but her foreign nationality made the donation illegal if it had been accepted intentionally. Maehara apologised to the nation for only holding the post for 6 months and for "provoking distrust" over his political funding. According to the Japan Times, the resignation would cause Japanese relations with the United States to weaken. The donation was revealed by an opposing party politician, Shoji Nishida; The Economist described the incident as a scandal based on a technicality that primarily illustrates the unsatisfactory treatment of Koreans in Japan.

Candidacy for Prime Minister
Following Kan's announced resignation in August 2011, Maehara initially planned to support Finance Minister Yoshihiko Noda, but broke off this support due to disagreement over whether to raise the consumption tax, and declared his own candidacy for the presidency of the DPJ on 22 August. He lost to Noda and Economy Minister Banri Kaieda in the first round of balloting on 29 August.

Second stint as leader of the Democratic Party
In 2016, the DPJ merged with Japan Innovation Party forming the Democratic Party. Maehara attempted to make a comeback at the leadership in the first leadership election post-merger, but lost against former minister Renho.

Renho resigned in July 2017 after the DP suffered a bad result in the 2017 Tokyo assembly elections. A leadership election was immediately held to select the new leader of the party. Maehara was one of the candidates contesting the election, along with former Chief Cabinet Secretary Yukio Edano. Through his reliable support from conservative DP and former JIP members, Maehara comfortably won the leadership election with 60% of the points up for grabs. He returned as the leader of the largest opposition party almost 12 years after ascending to the post for the first time.

Maehara's second stint as president was short and rocky. One of his first acts as the new president was to appoint rising-star lawmaker Shiori Yamao as secretary-general in his new executive. Immediately after her nomination, tabloid magazine Shukan Bunshun published an allegation of affair against Yamao. Whilst the details were inconclusive, Yamao resigned from the party less than a week after the affair was reported, widely seen as an effort to halt further decline of DP's fledgling support. Maehara also faced a potential rival in Tokyo governor Yuriko Koike, who grew increasingly confident after her party's landslide win in the Tokyo Assembly elections and was rumoured of planning to form a conservative national party to face Prime Minister Shinzo Abe in the next general election.

Abe called a snap election less than three weeks to Maehara's ascension to the presidency. This threw the party into disarray, as it had not completed preparing its election platform. At the same day as Abe's election declaration, Koike finally launched a new party called Kibō no Tō (Party of Hope). Seeing Koike's high popularity at that time as a potential asset, Maehara coordinated with Koike on DP candidates' nominations for the election. Koike agreed to endorse DP candidates and Maehara effectively disbanded the party in order to allow the candidates run under the Kibō banner. However, despite Maehara's request, Koike imposed an ideological filter that effectively barred liberal-leaning members of the DP, such as Yukio Edano, from joining Kibō. This led Edano to form the Constitutional Democratic Party less than three weeks before election to house liberal DP members. Maehara himself ran as independent.

Koike's multiple blunders during the campaign led Kibō to fall well short of high initial expectations, becoming the second largest opposition party behind the Edano-led CDP. Maehara, whose political gamble had backfired, was under heavy pressure to resign from his position as DP president. Maehara resigned from his post and from the party on 28 October 2017, ending his tumultuous second term as leader of the Democratic Party.

Post 2017 election 
Maehara joined Kibō in November 2017. When Kibō merged with the Democratic Party in May 2018 to form the Democratic Party for the People, Maehara also joined the DPP.

References

External links
 

|-

|-

|-

|-

|-

1962 births
Living people
Kyoto University alumni
Democratic Party of Japan politicians
Foreign ministers of Japan
Ministers of Land, Infrastructure, Transport and Tourism of Japan
Japan New Party politicians
Members of the House of Representatives (Japan)
People from Kyoto
New Party Sakigake politicians
21st-century Japanese politicians
Members of the Kyoto Prefectural Assembly
Politicians from Kyoto Prefecture